La Lectura was a Spanish language monthly science, literary and arts magazine which was published in Madrid, Spain, between 1901 and 1920. Its subtitle was Revista de ciencias y artes.

History and profile
La Lectura was founded by the writer and journalist Francisco Acebal and academic Felipe Clemente de Velasco, and the first issue appeared in January 1901. The magazine was published in Madrid on a monthly basis. It enjoyed international readership, and covered significant articles on modern literature and art.

Julián Juderías and Alicia Pestana were among the regular contributors. La Lectura folded in December 1920.

References

External links

1901 establishments in Spain
1920 disestablishments in Spain
Defunct literary magazines published in Europe
Defunct magazines published in Spain
Literary magazines published in Spain
Magazines established in 1901
Magazines disestablished in 1920
Magazines published in Madrid
Monthly magazines published in Spain
Spanish-language magazines